Steven Thicot (born 14 February 1987) is a French footballer who plays as a central defender or as a defensive midfielder for Scottish League One side Clyde. Besides France, he has played in Scotland, Romania, Spain, Greece, Malaysia, the United States, and Lithuania.

Club career
Born in Montreuil, Seine-Saint-Denis, Thicot was trained at the Clairefontaine academy and was part of the France national youth football team that won the 2004 UEFA European Under-17 Football Championship. He signed for Nantes in 2003, but he did not play for their first team. He was loaned to Sedan for the 2006–07 season, for whom he appeared three times in Ligue 1, but he was eventually released by Nantes in June 2008.

Hibernian
Thicot went on trial with Scottish Premier League club Hibernian, for whom he appeared as a substitute in a pre-season friendly against FC Barcelona. He signed for Hibernian on 29 July 2008, and made his Scottish Premier League debut in the 1–0 defeat at Kilmarnock in early August. Thicot had to be substituted after just 33 minutes due to a thigh injury that kept him out of action for "weeks". He returned to the team in a 2–1 win at Aberdeen, but was again substituted.

Thicot became a regular under Mixu Paatelainen, but the Finnish manager left Hibs at the end of the 2008–09 season. John Hughes, who was appointed to replace Paatelainen, initially gave Thicot fewer opportunities in the team; Thicot made his first appearance of the 2009–10 season in January. Thicot continued to feature in the team infrequently under Colin Calderwood, and was advised in April 2011 that his contract would not be renewed.

Thicot then signed for Portuguese club Naval.

Dinamo București
In August 2013, Thicot signed a contract for three years with Romanian club Dinamo București. He scored his first goal for Dinamo on 6 October, in a match against Ceahlăul Piatra Neamț.

Back in Portugal: Belenenses and Tondela
In the 2014–15 season Thicot played for Belenenses Lisabon and helped them to finish 7th in Portugal Liga NOS. In the first half of the 2015–16 season Thicot was without club, eventually he signed for Tondela in January 2016, in that time last placed club in Portugal League, but they succeed to stay in league with series of good results in second half of season and finally won in last round and secure their place in top league.

Charlotte
In March 2019, he moved to Charlotte Independence.

Lithuania: FK Kauno Žalgiris
On 3 March 2020 m. in their official website FK Kauno Žalgiris announced the signing the French player. The club finished 4th last season in the domestic league, and it is promising an opportunity to play in 2020–21 UEFA Europa League. After season of 2021 he left FK Kauno Žalgiris.

Clyde 
On 12 May 2022, Thicot made his return to Scotland and penned a one-year deal with Scottish League One side Clyde.

References

External links
 L'Equipe profile

1987 births
Living people
Sportspeople from Montreuil, Seine-Saint-Denis
French footballers
French expatriate footballers
Association football utility players
France youth international footballers
Association football central defenders
Association football midfielders
INF Clairefontaine players
FC Nantes players
CS Sedan Ardennes players
Hibernian F.C. players
Associação Naval 1º de Maio players
FC Dinamo București players
C.F. Os Belenenses players
C.D. Tondela players
Athlitiki Enosi Larissa F.C. players
Melaka United F.C. players
FK Kauno Žalgiris players
Charlotte Independence players
Ligue 1 players
Scottish Premier League players
Liga I players
Primeira Liga players
Super League Greece players
Malaysia Super League players
USL Championship players
A Lyga players
French expatriate sportspeople in Scotland
French expatriate sportspeople in Portugal
French expatriate sportspeople in Romania
French expatriate sportspeople in Greece
French expatriate sportspeople in Malaysia
French expatriate sportspeople in the United States
French expatriate sportspeople in Lithuania
Expatriate footballers in Scotland
Expatriate footballers in Portugal
Expatriate footballers in Romania
Expatriate footballers in Greece
Expatriate footballers in Malaysia
Expatriate soccer players in the United States
Expatriate footballers in Lithuania
Clyde F.C. players
Scottish Professional Football League players
Footballers from Seine-Saint-Denis